Rudolf Eckstein (1 January 1915 – 25 May 1993) was a German rower who competed in the 1936 Summer Olympics.

In 1936 he won the gold medal as member of the German boat in the coxless four competition.

References

External links
Rudolf Eckstein's profile at databaseOlympics

1915 births
1993 deaths
Olympic rowers of Germany
Rowers at the 1936 Summer Olympics
Olympic gold medalists for Germany
Olympic medalists in rowing
German male rowers
Medalists at the 1936 Summer Olympics
European Rowing Championships medalists